The 1905 Cork City by-election was a parliamentary by-election held for the United Kingdom House of Commons constituency of Cork City on 14 June 1905. The vacancy arose because of the death of the sitting member, J. F. X. O'Brien of the Irish Parliamentary Party. Only one candidate was nominated, Augustine Roche representing the Irish Parliamentary Party, who was elected unopposed.

Result

References

1905 elections in the United Kingdom
June 1905 events
By-elections to the Parliament of the United Kingdom in County Cork constituencies
Unopposed by-elections to the Parliament of the United Kingdom in Irish constituencies
1905 elections in Ireland